WRNY (1350 AM) is an American radio station broadcasting at 1350 kHz in Rome, New York.  The station was owned by Clear Channel Communications until September 2007, when ownership was transferred to Galaxy Utica as a result of Clear Channel's decision to "go private".    The station had been acquired by Clear Channel from Dame Media in June 1999.

WRNY also simulcasts on WTLB (1310 AM) in Utica, New York, and translator station W243DY (96.5 FM). All three stations are affiliated with ESPN Radio.

WTLB has been granted an FCC construction permit to decrease day power to 2,600 watts and decrease night power to 38 watts. The antenna pattern will change from directional to nondirectional.

History 
Before their transfer of ownership to Galaxy, WRNY and WIXT in Little Falls (which, from its sign-on in 1952 to 2005, was known by the call sign WLFH) operated as part of a four station network of sports talk radio stations identified as "The Sports Stars", along with WADR in Remsen and WUTQ in Utica. The stations carried a variety of local and syndicated sports talk programming, along with live coverage of local sporting events. The Sports Stars network also carried an affiliation with Fox Sports Radio, as was the standard for Clear Channel sports radio stations.

WTLB, at the time, was under Galaxy Communications ownership; WTLB was mostly a simulcast of WTLA in Syracuse (the call sign WTLB stands for the station's first GM, Thomas L. Brown) and WSGO in Oswego; all three stations ran an adult standards format supplied by the Music of Your Life network.

Upon Clear Channel's exit from the Utica market in September 2007, the network was rearranged. WADR and WUTQ, the two weakest stations in the network, were sold to Ken Roser and became full service outlets, while Galaxy Communications acquired WRNY and WIXT, which retained their sports format. Galaxy then paired the stations with WTLB, which ended its adult standards format to simulcast WRNY/WIXT. The stations retained their Fox Sports Radio affiliation, but changed their identification from "Sports Stars" to "1310 The Game." In 2010, Galaxy reached an affiliation deal with ESPN Radio, in which their Utica and Syracuse AM stations would join the network. The deal took effect on March 5, and WTLB/WIXT/WRNY promptly dropped Fox Sports to join ESPN. WTLA and WSGO also ended their Music of Your Life affiliation at that time to join ESPN.

Since WTLB and WRNY have to lower power at night to avoid interference with other stations, Galaxy sought an FM translator to serve the city at night. In 2012, they acquired translator W256AJ at 99.1 FM from the Christian Broadcasting System, owners of WJIV, moved the translator from Hotel Utica to the top of Smith Hill, and boosted its power. The new signal began simulcasting WRNY's programs on September 13, 2012. On September 8, 2016, W256AJ broke from its WRNY simulcast to become variety hits-formatted "Tony FM", which also simulcasts on the HD2 subchannel of sister station WKLL. WIXT followed suit on March 23, 2018. On November 15, 2018, WRNY programming was restored to the FM dial when Galaxy signed on translator W243DY at 96.5.

In 2016 Galaxy moved their Utica studios (WKLL, WOUR, WUMX, WTLB, WRNY and WIXT) from Washington Mills to Downtown Utica inside the new Landmarc Building (the old HSBC Location) and renamed it Galaxy Media. Inside their new location the walls on the side of the street for each studio are made entirely of glass, allowing people to see DJ's at work similar to the Good Morning America (Galaxy has long used a similar layout for their studio in Syracuse).

References

External links 

RNY (AM)
Sports radio stations in the United States
Rome, New York
ESPN Radio stations
Radio stations established in 1959
1959 establishments in New York (state)